Cryptolobatidae is a family of ctenophores. It is the only family in the monotypic order Cryptolobiferida and contains two genera, each with a single species.

Taxonomy
 Genus Cryptolobata
 Cryptolobata primitiva (Moser, 1909) - found in Indonesia and may possibly be a larval form
 Genus Lobocrypta
 Lobocrypta annamita Dawydoff, 1946 - found in the China Sea

References

Lobata